Loftin Farm is a historic farm and national historic district located near Beautancus, Duplin County, North Carolina. The district encompasses three contributing buildings. The house was built in 1852, and is a square one-story, hipped roof, wood-frame Greek Revival style cottage.  Also on the property are the contributing smokehouse (1852) and livestock / hay barn (1937).

It was added to the National Register of Historic Places in 2001.

References

Farms on the National Register of Historic Places in North Carolina
Historic districts on the National Register of Historic Places in North Carolina
Greek Revival houses in North Carolina
Houses completed in 1852
Houses in Duplin County, North Carolina
National Register of Historic Places in Duplin County, North Carolina
1852 establishments in North Carolina